Ascott is a village in Warwickshire, England. Population details can be found under Whichford.

External links

Villages in Warwickshire